2,6-Diisopropylaniline is an organic compound with the formula H2NC6H3(CHMe2)2 (Me = CH3).  It is a colorless liquid although, like many anilines, samples can appear yellow or brown.  2,6-Diisopropylaniline is a bulky aromatic amine that is often used to make ligands in coordination chemistry.  The Schrock carbenes often are transition metal imido complexes derived from this aniline.  Condensation with diacetylpyridine and acetylacetone gives, respectively, diiminopyridine and NacNac ligands.

References

Anilines